TRL Poland is the Polish version of the United States' most popular TV music show Total Request Live. It's aired from Monday to Friday at 5.00 p.m. on MTV Poland. The show, which started on July 11, 2005 is hosted by Kasia Wetz, Paulina Moś and Adam Beggerman live from Warsaw, Poland.

MTV original programming
Polish music television series
Polish reality television series